Jeff Beck's Guitar Shop is the sixth studio album by guitarist Jeff Beck, released in October 1989 through Epic Records. The album reached No. 49 on the U.S. Billboard 200 and won the award for Best Rock Instrumental Performance at the 1990 Grammys; this being Beck's second album to win that award, after Flash (1985).

"Stand on It" was released as a single and reached No. 35 on Billboard'''s Mainstream Rock chart; "Sling Shot" was featured in the 1990 horror comedy film Gremlins 2: The New Batch; several other tracks were used as part of the soundtrack for the 1990 South Atlantic Raiders episodes of the British comedy series The Comic Strip Presents.

In a further move from his previous jazz fusion stylings, Beck adopts a more straightforward instrumental rock approach on Guitar Shop'', save for two tracks ("Guitar Shop" and "Day in the House") on which drummer Terry Bozzio provides quirky spoken vocals.

Following Beck's death in 2023, guitarist Brian May described "Where Were You" as "possibly the most beautiful bit of guitar music ever recorded, probably alongside Jimi Hendrix's 'Little Wing'."

Track listing

Personnel
Jeff Beck – guitar, production
Tony Hymas – keyboard (including bassline), synthesizer, production
Terry Bozzio – drums, percussion, spoken vocals, production

Technical
Leif Mases – engineering, mixing, production
Dick Beetham – engineering assistance
Neil Amor – engineering assistance
James Allen Jones – engineering assistance
Chris Drohan – engineering assistance
Ian Gillespie – mastering

Charts

Album

Singles

Awards

References

External links
Jeff Beck Guitar Shop review at Guitar Nine Records
Jeff Beck - Jeff Beck's Guitar Shop (1989) album releases & credits at Discogs
Jeff Beck - Jeff Beck's Guitar Shop (1989) album credits & user reviews at ProgArchives.com

Jeff Beck albums
1989 albums
Epic Records albums
Grammy Award for Best Rock Instrumental Performance